Ooni Ogboruu was the 19th Ooni of Ife, a paramount traditional ruler of Ile Ife, the ancestral home of the Yorubas. He succeeded Ooni Osinkola and was succeeded by  
Ooni Giesi.

References

Oonis of Ife
Yoruba history